Bobrov is a town and the administrative center of Bobrovsky District in central Voronezh Oblast, Russia, located on the right bank of the Bityug River,  southeast of Voronezh, the administrative center of the oblast. Population:  It was previously known as Bobrovskaya Sloboda (until 1779).

History
It was established in 1698 as Bobrovskaya Sloboda and was granted town status and given its present name in 1779.

Administrative and municipal status
Within the framework of administrative divisions, Bobrov serves as the administrative center of Bobrovsky District. As an administrative division, it is, together with three rural localities in Bobrovsky District, incorporated within Bobrovsky District as Bobrov Urban Settlement. As a municipal division, this administrative unit also has urban settlement status and is a part of Bobrovsky Municipal District.

Transportation
Bobrov is also a railway station on the Povorino-Liski branch.

Notable people
Vladimir Patkin (1945), Olympic volleyball player
 Pawel Kassatkin (1915–1987), Russian writer

References

Notes

Sources

External links
Official website of Bobrov 
Bobrov Business Directory 

Cities and towns in Voronezh Oblast
Bobrovsky Uyezd
Populated places established in 1698
1698 establishments in Russia